Malur Assembly constituency is one of the 224 constituencies in the Karnataka Legislative Assembly of Karnataka a south state of India. It is also part of Kolar Lok Sabha constituency.

Members of Legislative Assembly

Mysore State
 1951: H. C. Linga Reddy, Indian National Congress

 1957: H. C. Linga Reddy, Indian National Congress

 1962: S. V. Rame Gowda, Independent

 1967: H. C. Linga Reddy, Indian National Congress

 1972: A. V. Munisami, Indian National Congress

Karnataka State
 1978: P. N. Reddy, Indian National Congress (Indira)

 1983: A. Nagaraju, Janata Party

 1985: H. B. Dyavarappa, Janata Party

 1989: A. Nagaraju, Indian National Congress

 1994: H. B. Dyavarappa, Janata Dal

 1999: A. Nagaraju, Indian National Congress

 2004: S. N. Krishnaiah Setty, Bharatiya Janata Party

 2008: S. N. Krishnaiah Setty, Bharatiya Janata Party

 2013: K. S. Manjunath Gowda, Janata Dal (Secular)

 2018: K.Y. Nanjegowda, Indian National Congress

See also
 Kolar district
 List of constituencies of Karnataka Legislative Assembly

References

Assembly constituencies of Karnataka
Kolar district